Brigadier General John Arthur Clark,  (8 June 1886 – 18 January 1976) was a Conservative member of the House of Commons of Canada. He was born in Dundas, Ontario and became a barrister and solicitor.

Clark attended secondary school in Vancouver, then studied at the University of Toronto and Osgoode Hall Law School, earning Bachelor of Arts and Bachelor of Laws degrees. During his career, he founded the law firm  Clark Wilson along with his childhood friend and Second-in-Command, Alexander Wilson. He served as a soldier during World War I, from 1914 to 1918 as commander of the 72nd Seaforth Highlanders and from 1918 to the war's end with the 7th Canadian Brigade (3rd Canadian Division). His awards include the Companion of the Order of St Michael and St George (CMG) and the Distinguished Service Order (DSO) with two Bars.

He was first elected to Parliament at the Burrard riding in the 1921 general election. With riding boundary changes, Clark became a candidate for Vancouver—Burrard and won election there in 1925 and 1926. After completing his third House of Commons term, the 16th Canadian Parliament, Clark left federal politics and did not seek re-election in the 1930 election.

Clark served as president of the Canadian Bar Association from 1951 to 1952.

References

External links
 
 https://web.archive.org/web/20101006221642/http://www.cwilson.com/about/firm-history.html

1886 births
1976 deaths
Canadian generals of World War I
Conservative Party of Canada (1867–1942) MPs
Members of the House of Commons of Canada from British Columbia
People from Dundas, Ontario
University of Toronto alumni
Lawyers in British Columbia
Canadian King's Counsel
Canadian Bar Association Presidents
Canadian Companions of the Order of St Michael and St George
Canadian Companions of the Distinguished Service Order
Canadian generals
Canadian military personnel from Ontario
Canadian Expeditionary Force officers
Seaforth Highlanders of Canada officers